The following is a list of notable Iranian scholars, scientists and engineers around the world from the contemporary period. For pre-modern era, see List of pre-modern Iranian scientists and scholars. For mathematicians, see List of Iranian mathematicians.

A
 Behnaam Aazhang, professor boob, Rice University
 Akbar Adibi, electronic engineer, VLSI researcher, professor of engineering, Amirkabir University of Technology
 Majid Adibzadeh, scholar and Political scientist
 Haleh Afshar, academic and peer, University of York
 Masoud Alimohammadi, assassinated quantum field theorist and elementary-particle physicist
 Abbas Amanat, professor of history and international studies at Yale University 
 Shahram Amiri
 Anousheh Ansari, the world's first female space tourist, co-founder and chairman of Prodea Systems, Inc.,  co-founder and former CEO of Telecom Technologies, Inc. (TTI)
 Farhad Ardalan, physicist, IPM
 Nima Arkani-Hamed, professor, Institute for Advanced Study
 Nasser Ashgriz, professor of mechanical and industrial engineering, University of Toronto
Touraj Atabaki, professor of social history of the Middle East and Central Asia, Department of History, University of Amsterdam
 Reza Amrollahi, Physicist and the former president of the Atomic Energy Organization of Iran

B
 Mehdi Bahadori, professor of mechanical engineering
 Hossein Baharvand, professor of stem cell and developmental biology, and director of Royan Institute for Stem Cell Biology and Technology
 Shaul Bakhash, historian, George Mason University
 Asef Bayat, professor of sociology and Middle East Studies at the University of Illinois at Urbana-Champaign
 Nariman Behravesh, chief economist and executive vice president, Global Insight
 Mahmoud Behzad, pioneer Iranian biologist
 Mina Bissell, director of UC Berkeley Life Sciences Division

D
 Touraj Daryaee, Iranologist and historian, University of California, Irvine

E
 Abbas Edalat, professor of computer science and mathematics, Imperial College London
 Kamran Elahian, entrepreneur
 Kamran Eshraghian, VLSI pioneer in Australia

F
 Mohsen Fakhrizadeh, nuclear physicist and scientist, former head of the Organization of Defensive Innovation and Research.
Fereydoon Family, Samuel Candler Dobbs Professor of Physics, Emory University
 Yasaman Farzan, Kharazmi young scientist Award in 2006, Young Scientist Prize of the International Union of Pure and Applied Physics (IUPAP) in 2008, International Centre for Theoretical Physics Prize in 2013

G
 Nasir Gebelli, computer scientist and video game developer
 Zoubin Ghahramani, professor of information engineering, Department of Engineering, University of Cambridge
 Mohammed Ghanbari, professor, University of Essex
 Mehdi Golshani, professor, Sharif University of Technology
 Vartan Gregorian, president, Carnegie Corporation of New York

H
 Mohammad Reza Hafeznia, professor, University of Tehran
 Ali Hajimiri, Caltech, professor of electrical engineering, co-founder of Axiom Microdevices Inc.
 Majid Hassanizadeh, professor of hydrogeology; expertise: theories of porous media (Utrecht University, the Netherlands)
 Babak Hassibi, professor of electrical engineering, Caltech
 Mahmoud Hessaby, physicist, father of modern physics in Iran
 Payam Heydari, professor of electrical engineering and computer science, University of California, Irvine
 Eric Hooglund, professor of political science

I
 Reza Iravani, professor and the L. Lau Chair in Electrical and Computer Engineering in the Edward S. Rogers Sr. Department of Electrical and Computer Engineering, University of Toronto

J
 Ali Jafari, professor of computer and information technology, Purdue University
 Hamid Jafarkhani, professor in electrical engineering and computer science, University of California, Irvine
 Ali Javan, physicist and inventor of the gas laser at MIT
 Kamaloddin Jenab, pioneering physicist

K
 Naser Kamalian, medical scholar and the father of modern neuropathology in Iran
 Mehran Kardar, physicist, MIT
 Ahmad Karimi-Hakkak, founding director of Center for Persian Studies, University of Maryland
 Homayoon Kazerooni, professor of mechanical engineering at the University of California, Berkeley, co-founder and Chief Scientist of Berkeley Bionics, inventor of the HULC
 Shaygan Kheradpir, chief operating officer, Barclays
 Omid Kordestani, senior vice president of worldwide sales and field operations, Google
 Farinaz Koushanfar, Henry Booker Professor of Electrical and Computer Engineering, UC San Diego (UCSD); Director of the Center for Machine Intelligence and Security (MICS) at UCSD

L
 Caro Lucas, scientist; professor and founding director of the Center of Excellence for Control and Intelligent Processing (CIPCE), School of Electrical and Computer Engineering, University of Tehran; researcher at the School of Cognitive Sciences (SCS), Institute for Studies in Theoretical Physics and Mathematics (IPM), Tehran

M
 Esfandiar Maasoumi, Fellow of the Royal Statistical Society, Southern Methodist University
 Iraj Malekpour,  professor of space physics
 Alireza Mashaghi, professor of systems biomedicine and physics, Leiden University and Harvard University
 Abbas Milani, director of Iranian Studies Program, Stanford University
 Farzaneh Milani, director of studies in women and gender, University of Virginia
 Maryam Mirzakhani, mathematician and a professor of mathematics at Stanford University, and first woman to be awarded the Fields Medal
Minoo Mohraz, physician, researcher, infectious diseases specialist, AIDS specialist, professor at the Tehran University of Medical Sciences.
 Parviz Moin, Franklin P. and Caroline M. Johnson Professor of Mechanical Engineering, Stanford University
 Ali Montazeri, public health scientist at the Health Metrics Research Center of the Iranian Institute for Health Sciences Research
 Mohsen Mostafavi, dean of Cornell University College of Architecture, Art, and Planning
 Hamid Mowlana, director of the Division of International Communication at American University in Washington D.C., and former president of the International Association for Media and Communication Research

N
 Firouz Naderi, associate director, Project Formulation and Strategy, Jet Propulsion Laboratory, NASA
 Hossein Nasr, philosopher, George Washington University
 Farzad Nazem, former chief technical officer and executive vice president, Yahoo!
 Camran Nezhat, director of Stanford Endoscopy Center for Training & Technology, Stanford University
 Mehrdad Nikoonahad, vice president of business development, PDF Solutions, Inc.

O
 Pierre Omidyar, founder of eBay

P
 Kaveh Pahlavan, professor and director of CWINS, Worcester Polytechnic Institute
 Hashem Pesaran, fellow of Trinity College, Fellow of The British Academy, former director of the Applied Econometrics Program at UCLA, founding editor of the Journal of Applied Econometrics, Cambridge University

R
 Ali R. Rabi, founding chair of the Middle East Citizens Assembly, University of Maryland
 Yahya Rahmat-Samii, professor of electromagnetics at UCLA
 Sohrab Rohani, chair, Department of Chemical and Biochemical Engineering, University of Western Ontario
 Mostafa Ronaghi, chief technology officer and senior vice president of Illumina

S
 Pardis Sabeti, geneticist, assistant professor, Center for Systems Biology and Department of Organismic and Evolutionary Biology, Harvard University
 Hossein Sadri, dean, associate professor of architectural theory, Girne American University
 Reihaneh Safavi-Naini, cryptographer, professor in School of Computer Science, University of Wollongong
 Muhammad Sahimi, chair of Chemical Engineering Department, University of Southern California
 Farrokh Saidi, medical professor and administrator, permanent member of Iranian Academy of Medical Sciences
 Jawad Salehi, inventor of optical code division multiple access, professor of electrical engineering at Sharif University of Technology
 Majid Samii, neurosurgeon and scientist, president of the International Society for Neurosurgery
 Mohammad-Nabi Sarbolouki, professor of macromolecular physical chemistry, Tehran University
 Hossein Seifzadeh, professor of Department of Political Sciences, University of Tehran
 Cyrus Shahabi, chair of the Computer Science Department, University of Southern California
 Alireza Shapour Shahbazi, lecturer in Achaemenid archeology and Iranology at Harvard University; full professor of history in Eastern Oregon University, Eastern Oregon University
 Mohammad Shahidehpour, former dean of the Graduate College and Associate VP for Research, Illinois Institute of Technology
 Freidoon Shahidi, university research professor, Memorial University of Newfoundland
 Manuchehr Shahrokhi, Craig Fellow/professor, editor of the Global Finance Journal, California State University, Fresno
 Vahid Shams Kolahi, solid-state physicist with contribution to CIGS and CdTe solar cells
 Amir Ali Sheibany, professor of geology, University of Tehran; founder and chairman of the National Iranian Steel Corporation (ZobAhan AryaMehr)
 Saeed Shirkavand, former vice minister in Ministry of Economic Affairs and Finance (Iran), assistant professor in management faculty of University of Tehran
 Hamid Shirvani, president and professor of art and architecture, Briar Cliff University
 Amin Shokrollahi, professor of I&C faculty and the head of ALGO lab, EPFL,  Switzerland
 Gholam Reza Sinambari, chair of Department of Environmental Engineering, Fachhochschule Bingen
 Hamid Soltanian-Zadeh, senior scientist, Henry Ford Health System; professor of electrical and computer engineering, University of Tehran
 Saba Soomekh, professor of religious studies and Middle Eastern history at UCLA, and author of books and articles on contemporary and historical Iranian Jewish culture
 Abdolkarim Soroush, philosopher
 Kamran Talattof, professor, University of Arizona
 Vahid Tarokh, professor, Harvard University

V
 Cumrun Vafa, physicist, Harvard University
 Saba Valadkhan, biomedical scientist; assistant professor and RNA researcher at Case Western Reserve University
 Puya Vahabi, Professor/Lecturer of AI at the University of California, Berkeley

Y
 Alireza Yaghoubi, materials scientist, designer and entrepreneur 
 Ehsan Yarshater, distinguished professor, Columbia University
 Houman Younessi, professor, assistant dean of academics, Rensselaer Polytechnic Institute – Hartford Graduate Campus; director of Rensselaer Initiative in Systems Engineering (RISE)

Z
 Lotfi A. Zadeh, creator of fuzzy logic and fuzzy set, UC Berkeley
 Mehdi Zakerian, visiting professor, Penn Law, University of Pennsylvania, president of Iranian International Studies Association (IISA), editor-in-chief of International Studies Journal
 Esmail Zanjani, department chair of Department of Animal Biotechnology at University of Nevada, Reno
 Abdolhossein Zarrinkoob, scholar of Iranian literature, history of literature, Persian culture and history, professor at Tehran University

See also
 List of Iranian scientists from the pre-modern era
List of Iranian mathematicians
 Science and technology in Iran
 List of universities in Iran
 Higher education in Iran
 List of Iranian Research Centers
 International rankings of Iran in science and technology
 Brain drain in Iran, the world's highest in 2006

References

Scientists, Contemporary
Iranian
Iranian